Shahrukh Khan (born 27 May 1995) is an Indian cricketer. He plays for Tamil Nadu in domestic cricket and for the Punjab Kings in the Indian Premier League (IPL).

Career
Khan made his List A debut on 27 February 2014, for Tamil Nadu in the 2013–14 Vijay Hazare Trophy. He made his first-class debut for Tamil Nadu in the 2018–19 Ranji Trophy on 6 December 2018.

Khan was part of the Tamil Nadu side that went unbeaten all season on their way to winning the Syed Mushtaq Ali Trophy in 2021. Khan contributed an unbeaten 40 from 19 balls in the Quarter Final vs Himachal Pradesh.

In February 2021, Khan was bought by the Punjab Kings in the IPL auction ahead of the 2021 Indian Premier League. He made his IPL debut on 12 April 2021 against Rajasthan Royals and scored an unbeaten 6 off 4 balls. He was handed his maiden IPL cap by Chris Gayle.

In January 2022, Khan was named as one of two standby players in India's Twenty20 International (T20I) squad for their home series against the West Indies. In February 2022, he was bought by the Punjab Kings in the auction for the 2022 Indian Premier League tournament. Later the same month, in the opening round of matches in the 2021–22 Ranji Trophy, Khan scored 194 runs for Tamil Nadu against Delhi.

References

External links
 

1995 births
Living people
Indian cricketers
Punjab Kings cricketers
Tamil Nadu cricketers
Cricketers from Chennai